Aldeanueva de la Serrezuela is a municipality located in the province of Segovia in Castile and León, Spain. According to the 2004 census (INE), the municipality had a population of 54 inhabitants.

References

Municipalities in the Province of Segovia